ESPN Films, formerly known as ESPN Original Entertainment (EOE), is an American production company which produces and distributes sports films and documentaries. It is owned by ESPN Inc., a joint venture between The Walt Disney Company (which owns a controlling 80% stake) and Hearst Communications (which owns the remaining 20%).

Created in March 2008, ESPN Films produces films covering sports-related stories. Projects from the subsidiary include 30 for 30 (and its offshoots 30 for 30: Soccer Stories and the digital series 30 for 30 Shorts), the critically acclaimed Nine for IX series and SEC Storied.

History
ESPN Films traces its history to 2001, when ESPN Inc. formed ESPN Original Entertainment, a programming division which produced various talk shows, series, documentaries and made-for-TV films that aired on ESPN and its related networks. The subsidiary ceased operations for several months starting in 2007. The company's logo did not appear as a vanity card on any ESPN programs, with the exception of the daily talk show Jim Rome is Burning.

On 3 March 2008, ESPN announced that it would relaunch the unit as ESPN Films. Under the restructuring, ESPN Films began producing projects for theatrical release in addition to television; majority corporate parent The Walt Disney Company holds the right of first refusal on all projects. In addition, ESPN announced a new alliance with the Creative Artists Agency, which among its various clients, represents athletes such as LeBron James, David Beckham and Peyton Manning.

The first production under the ESPN Films banner was Black Magic, a four-hour documentary that premiered on ESPN without commercial interruption over two consecutive nights starting on March 16, 2008. The film, which won a Peabody Award in 2009, about the history of basketball played at Historically Black Colleges and Universities. The company's first theatrical film was X Games 3D: The Movie, which was released on August 21, 2009.

On October 6, 2009, ESPN premiered 30 for 30, a 30-hour series produced by ESPN Films that debuted in commemoration of the 30th anniversary of the cable network's launch. Among those participating in the project included Spike Lee, Richard Linklater, Barry Levinson and Mike Tollin. The series, which earned Peabody and Producer's Guild Awards and was nominated for an Emmy, featured thoughtful and innovative reflections on the previous three decades in sports told through a diverse array of sports fans and social commentators. Positive reaction from both critics and viewers led to a spin-off 30 for 30: Volume II. ESPN took its first ever Academy Award when  O.J.: Made in America film won in the category of Best Documentary Feature at the 2017 Oscars.

List of ESPN Original Entertainment/ESPN Films productions

Talk shows
 Around the Horn (2002–present)
 Cold Pizza (2003–2007; now known as First Take)
 ESPN Hollywood (2005–2006)
 The Fantasy Show (2006)
 Jim Rome Is Burning (2003–2012)
 Pardon the Interruption (2001–present)
 Quite Frankly with Stephen A. Smith (2005–2007)
 SportsCenter (1988–present)

Series
 Playmakers (2003)
 Tilt (2005)

Mini-series
 The Bronx is Burning (2007)
 The Captain (2022)

Events
 ESPY Awards (1993–present)
 X Games (1995–present)
 Winter X Games (1997–present)
 World Series of Poker (1988–present)

Reality
 Battle of the Gridiron Stars (2005–present)
 Bonds on Bonds (2006)
 Bound for Glory (2005)
 It's The Shoes
 Madden Nation (2005–present)
 Knight School (2006)
 Streetball
 The Contender (2006–present)
 The Life

Game shows
 Stump the Schwab (2004–2006)
 2 Minute Drill (2000–2002)

Documentaries
 Once in a Lifetime: The Extraordinary Story of the New York Cosmos (2006)
 Through the Fire (2005)
 Kobe Doin' Work (2009)
 30 for 30 (2009–2010, 2012–present)
 Wendell Scott: A Race Story (2011)
 ESPN Films Presents (2011–2012)
 Nine for IX (2013)
 O.J.: Made in America (2016)
 Baltimore Boys (2017)
 The Last Dance (2020)

Films
 3: The Dale Earnhardt Story (2004)
 A Season on the Brink (2002)
 Code Breakers (2005)
 Hustle (2004)
 Ruffian (2007)
 The Junction Boys (2002)
 Four Minutes (2005)
 X Games 3D: The Movie (2009)
 Lombardi (2010 or 2011; produced in conjunction with NFL Films)
 Keepers of the Streak (2015)
 Queen of Katwe (2016; produced with Walt Disney Pictures)
 World Beaters (2017)
 144 (2021)
 Betsy & Irv'' (2022; short)

References

Films
Film production companies of the United States
Disney production studios
Entertainment companies established in 2001